Théâtre Montansier can refer to three different theatres built by Mademoiselle Montansier:
 Théâtre Montansier (Versailles), Montansier's theatre in Versailles (opened 18 November 1777)
 Théâtre du Palais-Royal in Paris, known as the Théâtre Montansier in 1790, 1800, and 1848–1852
 Théâtre National (rue de la Loi), her theatre on the rue de la Loi (rue de Richelieu) in Paris (opened 15 August 1793; demolished 1820)